The men's shot put at the 2021 World Athletics U20 Championships was held at the Kasarani Stadium on 18 and 19 August.

Records

Results

Qualification
The qualification took place on 18 August, in two groups, with Group A starting at 09:51 and Group B starting at 10:32. Athletes attaining a mark of at least 19.20 metres ( Q ) or at least the 12 best performers ( q ) qualified for the final.

Final
The final was held on 19 August at 16:40.

References

Shot put
Shot put at the World Athletics U20 Championships